Minnesota State Highway 246 (MN 246) is a  highway in southeast Minnesota, which runs from its intersection with State Highway 3 in the city of Northfield and continues south and east to its eastern terminus at its intersection with State Highway 56 in Holden Township near Kenyon.

Route description
Highway 246 serves as an east–west and a north–south route between the communities of Northfield, Dennison, Nerstrand, and Kenyon in southeast Minnesota.  It follows a zigzag route running along section lines.

In the city of Northfield, Highway 246 follows Woodley Street W. and Division Street S.

Highway 246 passes near the town of Dennison at its junction with County Road 31.

The route is also known as Main Street in Nerstrand.

Nerstrand-Big Woods State Park is located near the junction of Highway 246 and Rice County Road 29 at Nerstrand.  The park entrance is located on County Road 29.

The route is legally defined as Routes 246 and 320 in the Minnesota Statutes. It is not marked with the latter number.

History
Highway 246 was authorized in 1949 between then-U.S. 65 at Northfield and Nerstrand. This original portion of the route was paved in 1956.

In 1959, the highway was extended east of Nerstrand to State Highway 56 in Holden Township near Kenyon. This segment was paved in the late 1970s.

Major intersections

References

External links

Highway 246 at the Unofficial Minnesota Highways Page

246
Transportation in Rice County, Minnesota
Transportation in Goodhue County, Minnesota